In mathematics, the oscillation of a function or a sequence is a number that quantifies how much that sequence or function varies between its extreme values as it approaches infinity or a point. As is the case with limits, there are several definitions that put the intuitive concept into a form suitable for a mathematical treatment: oscillation of a sequence of real numbers, oscillation of a real-valued function at a point, and oscillation of a function on an interval (or open set).

Definitions

Oscillation of a sequence
Let  be a sequence of real numbers. The oscillation  of that sequence is defined as the difference (possibly infinite) between the limit superior and limit inferior of :

.

The oscillation is zero if and only if the sequence converges.

Oscillation of a function on an open set
Let  be a real-valued function of a real variable.

Oscillation of a function at a point

More generally, if  is a real-valued function on a metric space, then the oscillation is

Examples

 has oscillation ∞ at  = 0, and oscillation 0 at other finite  and at −∞ and +∞.
 (the topologist's sine curve) has oscillation 2 at  = 0, and 0 elsewhere.
 has oscillation 0 at every finite , and 2 at −∞ and +∞.
or 1, -1, 1, -1, 1, -1... has oscillation 2.

In the last example the sequence is periodic, and any sequence that is periodic without being constant will have non-zero oscillation. However, non-zero oscillation does not usually indicate periodicity.

Geometrically, the graph of an oscillating function on the real numbers follows some  path in the xy-plane, without settling into ever-smaller regions. In well-behaved cases the path might look like a loop coming back on itself, that is, periodic behaviour; in the worst cases quite irregular movement covering a whole region.

Continuity 
Oscillation can be used to define continuity of a function, and is easily equivalent to the usual ε-δ definition (in the case of functions defined everywhere on the real line): a function ƒ is continuous at a point x0 if and only if the oscillation is zero; in symbols,  A benefit of this definition is that it quantifies discontinuity: the oscillation gives how much the function is discontinuous at a point.

For example, in the classification of discontinuities:
 in a removable discontinuity, the distance that the value of the function is off by is the oscillation;
 in a jump discontinuity, the size of the jump is the oscillation (assuming that the value at the point lies between these limits from the two sides);
 in an essential discontinuity, oscillation measures the failure of a limit to exist.

This definition is useful in descriptive set theory to study the set of discontinuities and continuous points – the continuous points are the intersection of the sets where the oscillation is less than ε (hence a Gδ set) – and gives a very quick proof of one direction of the Lebesgue integrability condition.

The oscillation is equivalent to the ε-δ definition by a simple re-arrangement, and by using a limit (lim sup, lim inf) to define oscillation: if (at a given point) for a given ε0 there is no δ that satisfies the ε-δ definition, then the oscillation is at least ε0, and conversely if for every ε there is a desired δ, the oscillation is 0. The oscillation definition can be naturally generalized to maps from a topological space to a metric space.

Generalizations
More generally, if f : X → Y is a function from a topological space X into a metric space Y, then the oscillation of f is defined at each x ∈ X by

See also 
 Wave equation
 Wave envelope
 Grandi's series
 Bounded mean oscillation

References

Further reading

Real analysis
Limits (mathematics)
Sequences and series
Functions and mappings
Oscillation